Brandon Fortenberry (born May 18, 1990) is an American professional basketball player for Balkan Botevgrad of the Bulgarian National Basketball League. He played college basketball for Southeastern Louisiana University He was born in Pigayune.

Career
In the 2011–12 season, as a senior in the Picayune Memorial High School, he was played only seven games because of a foot injury. He was later named a Preseason All-Southland Conference selection.

Fortenberry was selected by the Bakersfield Jam in the round 6 of the 2013 NBA Development League Draft. He left the Jam before the start of the season. He did not play pro basketball from 2013 to 2015.

For the 2015–16 season he signed with Balkan Botevgrad of the Bulgarian NBL. In 33 games he averaged 13.4 points per game. He was named the best foreign player in the 2015–16 Bulgarian championship.

On July 22, 2016, Fortenberry signed with Igokea for the 2016–17 season. On January 11, 2017, he was released by Igokea. In 15 ABA League games, he averaged 5.5 points, 2.1 rebounds and 1.7 assists per game.

On July 22, 2017, Fortenberry returned to Balkan Botevgrad.

References

External links
Beobasket profile

1990 births
Living people
African-American basketball players
American expatriate basketball people in Bosnia and Herzegovina
American expatriate basketball people in Bulgaria
KK Igokea players
BC Balkan Botevgrad players
Shooting guards
People from Picayune, Mississippi
American men's basketball players
Southeastern Louisiana Lions basketball players
21st-century African-American sportspeople